Sose Thanda Sowbhagya  is a Kannada-language television series first broadcast from 5 March 2012.

Plot 

It is the story of two women who become the daughters-in-law in a family. One tries to divide the family and the other tries to unite it.

Cast
 Sushma K. Rao
 Nikhila Rao
 C R Simha
 Shishir Shastry
 Varshinikusuma
 Marina Tara

References

External links
 Sose Thanda Sowbhagya official website on Zee Kannada TV India

2012 Indian television series debuts
Indian television soap operas